John Miles (born John Errington; 23 April 1949 – 5 December 2021) was an English rock singer, guitarist and keyboard player best known for his 1976 top 3 UK hit single "Music" and his frequent appearances at Night of the Proms. He won the "Outstanding Musical Achievement" award at the 2017 Progressive Music Awards. He released 10 albums from 1976 to 1999 and was also the touring musician for Tina Turner in 1987.

Early life
Miles was born John Errington in Jarrow, South Tyneside, to Alec and Doris, attending St. Peters School before passing his eleven-plus exam and joining Jarrow Grammar School. While still a pupil at Jarrow Grammar School, Miles started guitar lessons in nearby Hebburn and was encouraged by his grammar school music teacher, Jimmy Joseph, to take up a career in music; however, his first job after leaving school was making lavatory signs. Miles played in several local bands, including The Derringers, The New Atlantians and The Urge before joining The Influence, which also included Paul Thompson, later the drummer with Roxy Music, and Vic Malcolm, later lead guitarist with Geordie. This outfit released the single "I Want to Live" (Orange Records, 1969). Following this, he formed The John Miles Set, with Bob Marshall and Dave Symonds before starting his solo career in 1971. 

In 1972 Billboard magazine said "Orange, the (record) label offshoot of the Orange recording studios, will release John Miles' "Come Away MeLinda" as its first record through Pye..." 

There were other releases, including those written by Australian writing duo Vanda & Young: "The World Belongs to Yesterday" (1972), "Yesterday Was Just the Beginning of My Life" (1972) and "One Minute Every Hour" (1973). It was while on a break on a Saturday stint at Peter Stringfellow's Leeds club that he first started writing what became "Music". In 1972, the band appeared on the television series Opportunity Knocks.

Career

Success 
Miles signed a recording contract with the Decca UK label in 1975 and issued four albums; Rebel (1976) - No. 9 on the UK chart, Stranger in the City (1977) - No. 37 UK, Zaragon (1978) - No. 43 UK and More Miles Per Hour (1979) - No. 46 UK. However, Miles had the most success with singles and released a total of eighteen during this era, with four reaching the UK top 40. In addition to "Music", he also charted in the UK with "Highfly" (1975) - No. 17, "Remember Yesterday" (1976) - No. 32, and "Slow Down" (1977) - No. 10. In 1975, the readers of the Daily Mirror voted Miles as Best Newcomer. Not long after "Music"'s  release, Miles was described by Melody Maker as:

"Music" won Miles an Ivor Novello Award for Best Middle of the Road Song in 1977. Most of his songs were co-written with the bassist in his backing group, Bob Marshall.

At the peak of his success, in 1976 and 1977, Miles made several appearances on the weekly pop TV shows Supersonic and Top of the Pops. The debut album did receive some attention in the US. Two singles from the debut album reached the US Billboard Hot 100 chart, "Highfly" peaked at No. 68, followed by "Music" which stalled at No. 88. In Canada, "Highfly" reached No. 74, and "Slow Down" reached No. 68. However, "Music" reached No. 1 on the Dutch and Belgian charts and No. 4 on the Swiss charts. "Slow Down" was his biggest US chart hit, peaking at No. 2 on the disco chart, and at No. 34 on the Billboard Hot 100 in June 1977. It was later featured in the 1979 film Players, starring Ali MacGraw and Dean Paul Martin. The album Zaragon reached No. 3 on the Swedish and Portuguese charts. In his US tour to promote Zaragon, Billboard stated that:

The relative success in the US charts led to Miles supporting Elton John on his tour. Miles and his band would go on to tour with other famous artists, such as Fleetwood Mac, Aerosmith, Jethro Tull and the Rolling Stones. In 1978, Miles was invited to appear on the BBC Sight and Sound in Concert programme which was simultaneously on BBC Radio 1 and BBC 2 on 11 March 1978.

Later career 
Unfortunately the early success of Rebel tailed off so much that Ian Gilbey in Electronics & Music Maker wrote:

From 1985, Miles participated almost every year in the Night of the Proms, a series of concerts held yearly in Belgium, the Netherlands, Germany, Luxembourg, Poland, Denmark and the United States. Regularly there were also shows in Spain, France, Austria, Switzerland and Sweden. The concerts consist of a combination of pop music and popular classical music (often combined) and various well-known musicians and groups usually participate.

Miles always performed "Music", regarded as the anthem of the show, and also sang other songs with other artists. In 2009, the album The Best of John Miles at the Night of the Proms was released, which included "Music" and cover versions including "All by Myself", "Bohemian Rhapsody" and "It Was a Very Good Year".

Miles' 1986 album Transition was described by Billboard as:

Miles also toured with Tina Turner from 1987, playing keyboards, guitar and supporting vocals on every one of her tours, and played on several of her albums. He also appeared on Jimmy Page's 1988 album Outrider and subsequent tour (his wide-ranging vocals allowed him to cover both Robert Plant and Paul Rodgers from Page's two previous bands), and played Hammond organ on Joe Cocker's album Night Calls (1992), with whom he toured for two years. In 1990, Miles participated in the UK heat of A Song for Europe with the song "Where I Belong", which came second.

Miles was also a frequent guest vocalist on albums by the Alan Parsons Project, being featured on Tales of Mystery and Imagination (1976), Pyramid (1978), Stereotomy (1985), and Gaudi (1987), as well as on the Eric Woolfson album Freudiana (1990). He appeared on Andrea Bocelli's track "Funiculi Funicula" on his 1997 album Romanza.

His first DVD, John Miles – Live in Concert was released in 2002. In 2007, Miles performed in Gelsenkirchen, Germany with German band Pur and sang two songs. On one of those songs, "Abenteuerland", Miles sang with Pur in German. The concert is available on the DVD, Pur&Friends-Live-auf-Schalke-2007. In October 2008, Miles began touring once again with Tina Turner until May 2009.

The Olympiapark in Munich gave Miles a symbolic key to the park in 2015 as the performer who had opened the door the most times, and the moment was recorded on the Munich Olympic Walk of Stars.

In 2017, Miles was awarded an outstanding contribution to music award at the Progressive Rock awards.

In 2019, Miles starred in a flashmob performance of "Music" organized by Südwestrundfunk (SWR; Southwest Broadcasting), a regional public broadcasting corporation serving the southwest of Germany. It was held in the marketplace of Landau and involved more than 100 people including the members of the State Youth Orchestra of Rhineland Palatinate and 20 camera operators.

In 2020, Miles recorded a new version of "Music" remotely with the Antwerp Philharmonic 'Quarantine' Orchestra due to the cancellation of the Night of the Proms due to Covid.

Musicals
In 1998, Miles entered the world of stage musicals by creating the score for the adaption of Robert Westall's The Machine Gunners by Tom Kelly and Ken Reay. This was followed in 1999 with further collaboration with Tom Kelly on Tom and Catherine, the life story of the romantic writer Catherine Cookson and her husband Tom. Their next work was Dan Dare The Musical in 2003, with Miles writing the score for Cuddy's Miles by Arthur McKenzie and David Whitaker, which was about the Jarrow Marches with the character Cuddy being Miles grandfather Cuthbert. In 2016, Miles and Kelly collaborated on Dolly Mixtures, a musical based on the story of eight women who set-up a variety act when one of their husbands was diagnosed with cancer – later going on to raise £100,000 in the 1970s and 1980s.

Personal life and death 
Miles died after a short illness on 5 December 2021 at the age of 72 and was survived by his wife of nearly 50 years, Eileen, two children and two grandchildren. His son, John Miles Jr., is also a musician and played with groups such as Milk Inc., Sylver, the Urge and Fixate.

Alan Parsons wrote of Miles:

Carl Huybrechts, one of the joint creators of Night of the Proms said:

Discography

See also 
 List of 1970s one-hit wonders in the United States
 List of artists under the Decca Records label
 List of performers on Top of the Pops
 Orange Records

References

External links 

 john-miles.net—Unofficial website
 
 

1949 births
2021 deaths
English male singer-songwriters
Decca Records artists
EMI Records artists
English male guitarists
20th-century English male singers
20th-century English singers
English rock guitarists
English rock keyboardists
English songwriters
Harvest Records artists
London Records artists
Arista Records artists
People from Jarrow
Musicians from Tyne and Wear
Musicians from County Durham
English rock singers